The Obituary of Tunde Johnson is an American drama film, directed by Ali LeRoi and released in 2019.

Premise
Tunde Johnson is a gay Nigerian-American teenager who is in a secret relationship with his school's white lacrosse champion Soren. Soren is closeted and officially dating popular girl Marley, Tunde's best friend since childhood. The day of Soren's birthday, when the two boys have planned to come out to their families, Tunde is stopped and fatally shot by a police officer. Following his death, he wakes up the previous morning and becomes trapped in a time loop, forced to relive the day of his murder, which keeps happening in different ways no matter how hard he tries to change it.

Cast
 Steven Silver as Tunde Johnson, a gay African-American teenager who is trapped in a time loop that forces him to repeatedly relive the day of his fatal, racially motivated shooting by a police officer
 Nicola Peltz as Marley Meyers, Tunde's longtime friend
 Spencer Neville as Soren O'Connor, a closeted classmate who is secretly dating both Tunde and Marley in a love triangle
 David James Elliott as Soren's conservative father Alfred, who hosts a talk show about current affairs
 Alessandra Rosaldo as Dr. Martínez, Tunde's therapist
 Sammi Rotibi as Tunde's father Ade
 Tembi Locke as Tunde's mother Yomi

Production

The screenplay was written by Stanley Kalu, a film student at the University of Southern California. It was the first-ever winner of The Launch, a screenwriting competition to find and develop screenplays by promising new writers on which LeRoi was a judge; the competition's prize included the screenplay being produced as a feature film, and LeRoi signed on to direct it as his own feature film debut.

Release
The film premiered at the 2019 Toronto International Film Festival.

Reception

Accolades

References

External links
 
 

2019 films
2019 directorial debut films
American LGBT-related films
African-American drama films
African-American LGBT-related films
LGBT-related drama films
2019 LGBT-related films
Time loop films
Films about police brutality
Gay-related films
Bisexuality-related films
Films about racism
2019 drama films
Films directed by Ali LeRoi
2010s American films